Kangphu Kang or Shimokangri is a mountain in the Himalayas. The peak is located on the border of Bhutan and China (Tibet).

Location 
The mountain has a western and eastern summit connected by a high ridge not dipping below 7,000 m. From the lower western summit (7,147 m on China's 1:50,000 People Liberation Army map), a 15 km north ridge including a 6,902 m summit branches of the main divide. The main ridge drops steeply from the west peak to a 6,040 m pass, separating it from Jejekangphu Kang (6,965 m). On the other side, the main ridge drops southeast from the east peak to a 6,220 m pass leading to Kangphu Kang II or Dop Kang (6,945 m).

Climbing history 
Kangphu Kang was first climbed over the north-face on 29 September 2002 by a South Korean expedition.

See also 
Mountains of Bhutan

References 

Mountains of Bhutan
Mountains of Tibet
International mountains of Asia
Bhutan–China border
Seven-thousanders of the Himalayas